Luis Manuel Galeano Molina (born 15 October 1991) is an international footballer from Nicaragua, who plays as a forward for ART Municipal Jalapa.

International career

International goals
Scores and results list Nicaragua's goal tally first.

References

External links 
 

1991 births
Living people
Nicaraguan men's footballers
Nicaragua international footballers
People from Nueva Segovia Department
2017 CONCACAF Gold Cup players
Association football forwards
2019 CONCACAF Gold Cup players